Thomas Edward Dandelet (August 1, 1897 – March 30, 1950) was an American college football and college basketball coach. He served as the head football coach at the First District Agricultural School—now known as Arkansas State University—from 1922 to 1923 and at Marshall College—now known as Marshall University—from 1931 to 1934, compiling a career college football record of 18–29–3. Dandelet was also the head basketball coach at Marshall from 1931 to 1935, tallying a mark of 43–35.

Career
From 1922 to 1923, Dandelet coached at the First District Agricultural School in Jonesboro, Arkansas, where he compiled an 0–13–1 record. Returning to the Tri-State (West Virginia, Ohio and Kentucky) area, Dandelet played for semi-professional football teams like Armco Steel in Catlettsburg, Kentucky, and with early National Football League teams like the Ironton (Ohio) Tanks and Portsmouth (Ohio) Spartans (today's Detroit Lions organization), while coaching football at his alma mater, the Wonders of Ceredo-Kenova High School in nearby Wayne County, West Virginia.

From 1931 to 1934, Dandelet coached at Marshall, where he compiled an 18–16–2 record despite being underfunded and out-manned often in the Buckeye Conference, which included the University of Cincinnati, Ohio University, the University of Dayton, Miami University and Ohio Wesleyan University. After being released as football coach to make way for Cam Henderson to assume the Herd football and basketball jobs, Dandelet remained as a professor in the Health, Physical Education and Recreation Department and was also Dean of Men through 1950 at Marshall College.

Dandelet died of a heart attack at his home in Huntington, West Virginia on March 30, 1950.

Head coaching record

College football

References

External links
 

1897 births
1950 deaths
Arkansas State Red Wolves football coaches
Basketball coaches from Minnesota
Marshall Thundering Herd football coaches
Marshall Thundering Herd men's basketball coaches
High school football coaches in West Virginia
Marshall University faculty
People from Faribault, Minnesota